Lionel Tollemache, 3rd Earl of Dysart (30 January 1649 – 23 February 1727 n.s.), styled Lord Huntingtower from 1651 to 1698, was a British Tory Member of Parliament and nobleman.

Dysart was the son of Sir Lionel Tollemache, 3rd Baronet (d.1669), and Elizabeth, 2nd Countess of Dysart (d.1698). Educated at Queens' College, Cambridge, Lionel succeeded to his father's baronetcy on his death, but also a raft of debts which bred in him a habit of frugality which was not shed in later years. In 1673, he contested Suffolk as a Tory; defeated by Sir Samuel Barnardiston, 1st Baronet, he had the return falsified by the sheriff, Sir William Soame, and took his seat in Parliament. An election committee declared Barnardiston elected who initially obtained £1,000 damages from him in a suit before the King's Bench, but the decision was overturned by the Court of Exchequer Chamber. Huntingtower was made a freeman of Eye in 1675. He briefly served as Member of Parliament for Orford in 1679 as a member of the Habeas Corpus Parliament. In 1685, he was again returned for that borough and made portman of Orford, an office he held until about 1709.

On 30 September 1680, he married Grace Wilbraham, the daughter and coheir of Sir Thomas Wilbraham, 3rd Baronet. They had five children:
 Lionel Tollemache, Lord Huntingtower (1682– 26 July 1712), married, on 6 December 1706, Henrietta (d. 1718), illegitimate daughter of William Cavendish, 2nd Duke of Devonshire, and had issue:
 Lionel Tollemache, 4th Earl of Dysart
 Henrietta Tollemache
 Lady Elizabeth Tollemache (d. 6 August 1746), married Sir Robert Salusbury Cotton, 3rd Baronet
 Lady Catherine Tollemache (d. 17 January 1754), married John Brydges, Marquess of Carnarvon (15 Jan 1703 – 8 Apr 1727) on 1 September 1724
 Lady Mary Tollemache (d. 2 December 1715)
 Lady Grace Tollemache (d. 27 May 1719)

Huntingtower went out of Parliament again upon the fall of James II. However, he was returned for Suffolk in 1698, and generally supported Tory principles. In that year, he succeeded his mother to become Earl of Dysart. In 1702, he was appointed Vice-Admiral of Suffolk and became (until 1716) a freeman of Dunwich, and in 1703, he was appointed Lord Lieutenant of Suffolk. He was also named High Steward of Ipswich that year, an office he held until his death. As Lord Lieutenant, he purged moderate Churchmen from lieutenancy offices. He was Mayor of Orford during the summer of 1704. His support for the "Tack" of the Occasional Conformity Bill led to his removal from his county offices in 1705. Campaigning on the basis of his support for the Tack, he was returned for Suffolk again in 1705. As a Scottish peer, he was forced to leave the House of Commons by the Acts of Union 1707. He was offered a barony in the Peerage of Great Britain by Queen Anne upon her accession, but declined.

Predeceased by his only son in 1712, Dysart remained a Tory and was considered a possible Jacobite, until his death in 1727. His male-line grandson Lionel inherited his titles.

References

External links
Dysart, Earl of (S, 1643) Cracroft's Peerage

1649 births
1727 deaths
Alumni of Queens' College, Cambridge
Earls of Dysart
Lord-Lieutenants of Suffolk
Tory MPs (pre-1834)
Lionel Tollemache, 3rd Earl Dysart
English MPs 1679
English MPs 1685–1687